AMAG Group Ltd is a Swiss corporate group primarily active in the automotive trade. Since September 2019, the administration of the entire AMAG group has been based in Cham in the canton of Zug[2], after relocating from Utoquai 49 in Zurich, where the group had been based since its foundation. The group employs around 6600 people and generated revenue of CHF 4.7 billion in 2019. The group is owned by the private holding company BigPoint Holding AG, in turn owned by Martin Haefner.

AMAG headquarters in Cham
The core business of the AMAG Group is the company AMAG Automobil- und Motoren AG founded in 1945 by Walter Haefner and based in Zurich. On 29 April 1948, the company signed an import agreement with Volkswagen, and then again with Porsche in 1951, both of which continue to form the basis of the car import business operated by AMAG. In May 2008, AMAG ceased importing Porsche vehicles, as the subsidiary Porsche Swiss Ltd asserted its right to the trade. However, AMAG remains the Porsche brand’s biggest retail partner and, according to information provided by the company itself, is the largest Porsche retail organisation in Switzerland with 13 sales and service locations and the fourth-largest Porsche dealer in the world.

From 1949-72, assembly of different types of vehicles took place in Schinznach Bad for Chrysler Corporation (Chrysler, DeSoto, Dodge, and Plymouth), Standard, Studebaker, and VW (Karmann-Ghia). 

The AMAG Group comprises AMAG Import Ltd; AMAG Automobil- und Motoren AG, which operates over 80 garages and a Bentley service centre in Cham; AMAG First Ltd; AMAG Leasing AG (leasing business); AMAG Services AG (Europcar car hire service, valet parking at Swiss airports and chauffeur services); and AMAG Parking Ltd. Since 2018, AMAG has been a co-owner of autoSense, the solution for digital vehicle networking, and since 2019 has been offering a car subscription model with Clyde. It is also a partner of the Swiss Startup Factory.

As of the new vehicle registrations in 2019, the market shares of the key AMAG brands are as follows: Volkswagen: 11.1%, Audi: 6.0%, ŠKODA: 7.7% and Seat: 4.6%.
Eva Maria Bucher-Haefner, the daughter of AMAG founder Walter Haefner, who died in 2012, sold her 50% share to her brother in December 2018 and stepped down from the boards of directors of the AMAG Group companies. The AMAG Group is therefore owned solely by Martin Haefner. The company’s former headquarters at Zurich’s Utoquai is owned by Eva Maria Bucher-Haefner; the AMAG garage and dealership situated on the ground floor operate there as tenants.

Logo
Until 2013, the company logo symbolised an Auto Union racing car Type A driving towards the viewer. The vehicle’s body formed the centre, with the front tyres and their drum brakes and axes to the left and right. In September 2013, AMAG completely overhauled its branding and thus also its logo. The company now uses plain lettering as its logo.

References

External links
 AMAG Official Homepage

Automotive companies of Switzerland
Retail companies established in 1945
Auto dealerships
Swiss companies established in 1945